Sar Rud may refer to:
 Sar Rud, Fars
 Sar Rud, Kalat, Razavi Khorasan Province
 Sar Rud, Sabzevar, Razavi Khorasan Province
 Sar Rud, Sistan and Baluchestan